is a 17th-century painting on silk by Kiyohara Yukinobu. It is in the collection of the Metropolitan Museum of Art.

Description and interpretation
This work depicts a tranquil scene of a quail standing beneath stalks of grain. The work recalls twelfth-century Chinese academic painting in its realism and asymmetrical composition. Quail and millet are a symbol of autumn.

References

Metropolitan Museum of Art 2017 drafts
Japanese paintings
Edo-period works
Paintings in the collection of the Metropolitan Museum of Art
Paintings by Kiyohara Yukinobu
Birds in art